Tunisia competed at the 2000 Summer Paralympics in Sydney, Australia from August 29 to September 9, 2000.[1] This was the nation's fourth appearance at the Summer Paralympics since 1988. The Tunisian Paralympic Committee sent a total of 10 athletes to the Games, 8 men and 2 women to compete in Athletics only. Tunisia left Sydney with a total of 11 Paralympic medals ( 6 gold, 4 silver and 1 bronze ).

Medal table

See also
Tunisia at the 2000 Summer Olympics
Tunisia at the Paralympics

References

Bibliography

External links
International Paralympic Committee

Nations at the 2000 Summer Paralympics
Paralympics
2000